Grjótagjá is a small lava cave near lake Mývatn in Iceland. It has a thermal spring inside.

In early 18th century the outlaw Jón Markússon lived there and used the cave for bathing. Until the 1970s Grjótagjá was a popular bathing site. But during the eruptions from 1975 to 1984 the temperature of the water rose to more than 50 °C (122 °F), though the temperature is slowly decreasing and has fallen below 50 °C again. The nearby lava cave of Stóragjá is being used as an alternative bathing site.

Grjótagjá was used as a location for filming the fifth episode of the third season of Game of Thrones, called "Kissed by Fire".

Sources 

Caves of Iceland
Lava caves
Volcanism of Iceland
North Volcanic Zone of Iceland
North Iceland